1997–98 Hong Kong FA Cup was the 24th staging of the Hong Kong FA Cup. It was competed by all of the 8 teams from Hong Kong First Division League. The competition kicked off on 4 May 1998 and finished on 10 May with the final.

Instant-Double captured the cup for the consecutive second time after beating South China by 3-1 in the final.

Fixtures and results

Bracket

Final

References

Hong Kong FA Cup
Hong Kong Fa Cup
Fa Cup